Oeschger Bluff is a flat-topped snow and rock bluff that projects from the southeast part of Mount Takahe in Marie Byrd Land. Mapped by United States Geological Survey (USGS) from surveys and U.S. Navy tricamera aerial photography, 1959–66. Named by Advisory Committee on Antarctic Names (US-ACAN) for Hans Oeschger (University of Bern, Switzerland), United States Antarctic Research Program (USARP) glaciologist at Byrd Station, 1968–69 and 1969–70.

Cliffs of Marie Byrd Land